The grey-bellied antbird (Ammonastes pelzelni) is a species of passerine bird in the family Thamnophilidae. It is found in the northwestern Amazon Basin. Its natural habitat is subtropical or tropical moist lowland forests.

The grey-bellied antbird was originally described by the English zoologist Philip Sclater in 1890 and given the binomial name Myrmeciza pelzelni. The specific epithet was chosen to honour the Austrian ornithologist August von Pelzeln (1825–1891). A molecular phylogenetic study published in 2013 found that the genus Myrmeciza was polyphyletic. In the resulting rearrangement to create monophyletic genera the grey-bellied antbird was moved to its own genus Ammonastes. The name of the genus combines the Ancient Greek words ammos "sand" and nastes "inhabitant" as the grey-bellied antbird occurs in vegetation growing on sandy soil.

References

grey-bellied antbird
Birds of the Amazon Basin
Birds of the Venezuelan Amazon
grey-bellied antbird
grey-bellied antbird
Taxonomy articles created by Polbot